58534 Logos, or as a binary system (58534) Logos-Zoe, is a trans-Neptunian object and binary system from the classical Kuiper belt, approximately  in diameter. The bright cubewano belonged to the cold population and has a 66-kilometer sized companion named Zoe.

In the Gnostic tradition, Logos and Zoe are a paired emanation of the deity, and part of its creation myth.

Zoe 

Logos is a binary with the components of comparable size orbiting the barycentre on a moderately elliptical orbit.

Logos was discovered on 04 February 1997, and its, companion, Zoe, was discovered on 17 November 2001 from Hubble Space Telescope observations by K. S. Noll, D. C. Stephens, W. M. Grundy, J. Spencer, Robert Millis, Marc Buie, Dale Cruikshank, S. C. Tegler, and W. Romanishin and announced on 11 February 2002.

After the discovery, it received the provisional designation . Once confirmed it was officially named (58534) Logos I Zoe. It orbits Logos with a semi-major axis of 8217 km in 309.9 days with an eccentricity of 0.546. Its estimated diameter is 66 km, and mass (0.15 ± 0.02) kg.

Orbit 

References

External links 
 IAUC 7824 – IAUC 7959
 
 

058534
058534
Named minor planets
Binary trans-Neptunian objects
19970204